Naujoji Akmenė (Samogitian: Naujuojė Akmenė) is a new town that was established in 1952 and is one of the newest cities in Lithuania. Its name means New Akmenė. It is an industrial base with concrete as its main product, with Public company Akmenės Cementas (English: Akmenė Concrete) producing 700,000 tonnes of concrete annually. As a new city, it did initially have well-developed infrastructure. For example, a special branch of the railway had to be built for the factory needs. The road network was rapidly developing before the city even existed.

Gallery

External links

Akmenės Cementas Official Website

Cities in Lithuania
Cities in Šiauliai County
Populated places established in 1952
Cities and towns built in the Soviet Union
Municipalities administrative centres of Lithuania
Kovno Governorate
Akmenė District Municipality
1952 establishments in Lithuania